SAI International Residential School  is a CBSE affiliated residential school inaugurated by Chief Minister of Odisha, Naveen Patnaik in April 2018 at Cuttack on the outskirts of Bhubaneshwar.  The school is a fully residential co-education school for students from Class IV to XI and is built on a sprawling 35-acre land. The school has stadium, hi-tech sporting facilities and coaches.

References

External links
 Official website
Naveen Patnaik unveils new SAI school in Cuttack

Schools in Bhubaneswar
International schools in India
Educational institutions established in 2018
Schools in Odisha
2018 establishments in Odisha